Luna Blanca is a 2012 Philippine television drama fantasy series broadcast by GMA Network. The series served as a sequel to the 2008 Philippine television series Luna Mystika. Directed by Dominic Zapata, it stars Jillian Ward, Mona Louise Rey, Bea Binene, Barbie Forteza, Bianca King and Heart Evangelista. It premiered on May 21, 2012 on the network's Telebabad line up replacing Biritera. The series concluded on October 26, 2012 with a total of 115 episodes. It was replaced by Temptation of Wife in its timeslot.

The series is streaming online on YouTube.

Cast and characters

Lead cast
 Jillian Ward, Bea Binene and Bianca King as Luna Sandoval / Luna De Jesus / Cara Amor Montecines
 Mona Louise Rey, Barbie Forteza and Heart Evangelista as Blanca S. Buenaluz

Supporting cast
 Camille Prats and Lani Mercado as Rowena Sandoval
 Raymart Santiago and Christopher de Leon as Luis Buenaluz
 Chynna Ortaleza and Carmi Martin as Divine Alvarez-Buenaluz
 Marissa Delgado as Consuelo Buenaluz
 Gina Alajar as Linda De Jesus
 Kristofer Martin and Mark Herras as Joaquin "Aki" Alvarez
 Nicky Castro and Derrick Monasterio as Kiko De Jesus
 Carlos Morales as Devolas / Diego Montecines
 Dante Rivero as Igme Sagrado
 Mercedes Cabral as Marietta Montecines
 Ryza Cenon as Ashley Alvarez
 Buboy Villar as Samuel "Samboy" De Jesus
 Allan Paule as Crispin De Jesus

Guest cast
 Marco Alcaraz as Alex
 Dexter Doria as Eloisa
 Jan Marini Alano as Belen
 Yassi Pressman as Kate
 Jade Lopez as Roma
 Bettina Carlos as Cherry
 Luis Alandy as Teddy

Overview
Associate producer, Jonathan Pachica, said that Luna Blanca is a sequel to Luna Mystika, GMA Network's 2008 drama series, which also starred Heart Evangelista. It premiered on November 17, 2008 and concluded on March 6, 2009. The prequel's story revolves around the twins' lives and their relationship with each other. On the other hand, the story is set 30 years later, which is about the twin sisters and their journey toward discovering their ancestry and fulfilling their personal destinies.

The connection between these two series was presented during Luna Blanca's premiere episode on May 21, 2012, where selected clips from Luna Mystika was shown while Rowena, the character played by Camille Prats, narrating a story to a bunch of children about the Sagrado family and the engkanto-blooded twins Luna and Celestina and how the latter transforms into a monster every time the full moon shines brightly at night who intends to scare the children. Lolo Igme, Rowena's grandfather portrayed by Dante Rivero (who was also part of the prequel as Don Joaquin Sagrado), came and asked Rowena not to make fun of her origin again. In the story, Rowena is revealed to be the last descendant of Luna Mystika; one thing she does not believe because she thinks that the engkanto and other supernatural creatures are just myth or merely imagination. Her disbelief persists until she encounters a black, smoke-like creature known as the engkanto in the forest who raped her. Rowena's nightmares are far from over when she gives birth to an unusual twin, one with fair skin (Blanca) and the other one with very dark complexions (Luna). Unknown to Rowena, Luna also has a mystical twin shadow aside from Blanca. the same eerie creature first unveiled in Luna Mystika.

Production
On May 2, 2012 at the story conference of the series, Cheryl Ching-Sy, the Senior Program Manager, explained that the series is a multi-generational drama. It will run for three chapters with a different line up of actors starring in each generation's story. The production is targeting a 25-week run for the series.

The producer hired, director Dominic Zapata to handle the series. Although he's busy doing two projects [helming primetime series, My Beloved and filming Boy Pick-Up: The Movie] at that time, Zapata accepted the job, said that he loves his work, he's hardly rest, but he's not complaining because he is a certified workaholic. Zapata is known to have directed top-rated shows like T.G.I.S., Mulawin, Captain Barbell, Darna, Ako si Kim Samsoon, LaLola, Diva and Grazilda.

Themes
Luna Blanca consists of three prominent themes: love, family and mysticism. In the first chapter of the series, the story focused more on family and mysticism. The first three episodes focuses on the ancestry of Rowena, her connection to Luna and Celestina, the mystery behind the sudden loss of her parents [which her grandfather blames on the engkantos], herself being a victim of sexual assault of a supernatural being [black engkanto], and the appearance of Luna's mystical shadow. Luna's mysterious persona is not revealed yet until the end of the first chapter. However, the story eventually develops into realistic drama that tells the sufferings of Rowena's family on raising the twins alone, alongside Luna's quest in conquering her mother's love, care, and acceptance despite the discrimination she faces. The unexpected, tragic death of Lolo Igme and the sisters' huge love for each other despite physical differences and ultimately, separation. Camille Prats, who is part of the series' main cast was quoted:

"The series will eventually develop into a realistic high drama with a social message overriding the mysticism of its prequel", she added.

On the second and third chapter, romance and mysticism became the main core of the story. The "love" aspect takes place when the two protagonists enters their adolescence and young adult years, respectively. The characters Joaquin who was played by Kristofer Martin and Aki by Mark Herras in the second and third books serves as love interests (as well as the "intricator") of Luna and Blanca. Mystic themes take place when Luna's persona unveils itself alongside the return of her twin shadow Ani, the human form of Devolas with Diego entering the picture, and the transformation of Luna's unnatural appearance to that of a typical morena, as she wished.

Casting
At the series' press conference held on May 15, 2012, the producer presented six actresses to portray and breathe life to the characters of Luna and Blanca.

Chosen to play the lead roles in the first chapter are child stars Jillian Ward as Luna, and Mona Louise Rey as Blanca. Prior to casting, the two child actresses were popular in their previous hit drama series Trudis Liit and Munting Heredera respectively. Marissa Delgado, a veteran villainess who plays the children's grandmother in the show, compares Ward and Rey; saying that Ward reminds her of Niño Muhlach (a well-known mid-70's child star) for being witty, jolly, and restless; Rey on the other hand is described as "sweet, ladylike, and reserved type who flashes a wholesome personality on and off camera.

Portraying the teen characters in the second chapter are Barbie Forteza as Blanca and Bea Binene as Luna. Forteza said in one of her interviews that she finds her role very challenging, saying: "It is easier to play the Tweety Pie roles, but not when the role demands control and let your partner in a scene cower in fear and tears." Her character who lives in the squatter's area requires her to act like rather rough and boyish. She initially read the script and asked director Dominic Zapata's nod to deliver her lines with her own words. That way, she got to express herself more than just following the script letter by letter. On the other hand, Binene finds the acting task three or four times grueling than her past projects. Aside from the dramatic acting it requires, she has to endure the itchy, hot feeling while her face and body are heavily covered with dark make-up. It usually takes two hours for her fair complexion to turn dark as soot, and makeup artists had to re-touch in every scene due to perspiration and oiliness.

In the first and second chapter, Camille Prats, Raymart Santiago and Chynna Ortaleza were cast as Rowena, Luis and Divine, respectively, the three prominent characters in the series.

Although reluctant to play the role for the second chapter, fearing that she might not fit nor be credible enough to be a mother of teenagers, Prats [who's only in her late 20s] accepted the role after producers explained how significant her role was.

In the last installment of the series Bianca King and Heart Evangelista played as the adult Luna and Blanca respectively.

Mark Herras taken over the role of Joaquin, the love interest of Blanca (Evangelista) and Luna (King), while, veteran actors Lani Mercado, Christopher de Leon and Carmi Martin taking over the now rapidly aged characters of Rowena, Luis and Divine, respectively.

Reception

Ratings
According to AGB Nielsen Philippines' Mega Manila household television ratings, the pilot episode of Luna Blanca earned a 26.3% rating. While the final episode scored a 24% rating.

Critical response
Alfredo B. Severino of Negros Daily Bulletin said that "Luna Blanca is an Epic literature in many ways. It was not written in poetic style but the extended narrative, its press release called multi-generational story, and the development of an old folk tale qualifies it to be epic-based." While Jerry Donato of The Philippine Star finds Jillian Ward and Mona Louise Rey as this generation's Flordeluna and Roberta "who can touch the viewer's heart and make him shed tears as their adorable characters enter the School of Hard Knocks."

Accolades

References

External links
 

2012 Philippine television series debuts
2012 Philippine television series endings
Fantaserye and telefantasya
Filipino-language television shows
GMA Network drama series
Television shows set in the Philippines